The women's 400 metres at the 2013 IPC Athletics World Championships was held at the Stade du Rhône from 20–29 July.

Medalists

See also
List of IPC world records in athletics

References

400 metres
2013 in women's athletics
400 metres at the World Para Athletics Championships